Andrangi is a village in East Godavari district in the state of Andhra Pradesh in India.

Geography

Demographics
As of Census 2011, Andrangi has population of 2056 of which 1035 were males while 1021 were females, sex ratio is 986. Population of child (age 0–6) was 202 which makes up 9.82% of total population of village. Literacy rate of the village was 60.84%.

References 

Villages in East Godavari district